is a former Japanese football player. She played for Japan national team.

Club career
Miyamoto played for OKI FC Winds.

National team career
In November 1999, Miyamoto was selected Japan national team for 1999 AFC Championship. At this competition, on November 12, she debuted against Nepal.

National team statistics

References

Year of birth missing (living people)
Living people
Japanese women's footballers
Japan women's international footballers
Nadeshiko League players
OKI FC Winds players
Women's association football goalkeepers